is a former Japanese football player and manager. He played for Japan national team.

Club career
Izumi was born in Hiroshima Prefecture on April 8, 1944. After graduating from Meiji University, he joined Japanese Regional Leagues club Toyota Motors in 1967. The club was promoted to Japan Soccer League Division 1 in 1972 and Division 2 in 1973. He retired in 1976.

National team career
On March 25, 1965, when Izumi was a Meiji University student, he debuted for the Japan national team against Singapore and Japan won the match. However, after graduating from university, he was not selected for Japan because he had joined a club that did not play in the Japan Soccer League.

Coaching career
After retirement, Izumi became a manager for Toyota Motors. He managed one season, but the club finished on last place and was relegated to Division 2.

National team statistics

References

External links
 
 Japan National Football Team Database

1944 births
Living people
Meiji University alumni
Association football people from Hiroshima Prefecture
Japanese footballers
Japan international footballers
Japan Soccer League players
Nagoya Grampus players
Japanese football managers
Association football forwards